Hariom Singh Rathore (9 August 1957 – 27 May 2019) was an Indian politician and a member of parliament in the 16th Lok Sabha from Rajsamand constituency of Rajasthan. He won the constituency in the 2014 Indian general election, as a Bharatiya Janata Party candidate.

Rathore was born on 9 August 1957 at Kelwa, Rajsamand, Rajasthan. His parents were Fateh Singh Rathore and Govind Kunwar. The possessor of a B.Com. degree, he attended Bhupal Nobles College in Udaipur and later became an agriculturalist. He married Praveena Hada on 23 November 1980 and had both a son and a daughter. He was elected to the Parliament of India in May 2014. He died on 27 May 2019.

References

External links
 Profile on National portal

1957 births
2019 deaths
India MPs 2014–2019
Bharatiya Janata Party politicians from Rajasthan
Lok Sabha members from Rajasthan
People from Rajsamand district